"Õ", or "õ" is a composition of the Latin letter O with the diacritic mark tilde.

The HTML entity is &Otilde; for Õ and &otilde; for õ.

Emilian-Romagnol 
In the Romagnol dialects, õ is used to represent , e.g. savõ  "soap".

Estonian
In Estonian, Õ is the 27th letter of the alphabet (between W and Ä), and it represents a vowel characteristic of Estonian, the unrounded back vowel , which may be close-mid back, close back, or close-mid central. The vowel was previously written with the letter Ö, but in the early 19th century, Otto Wilhelm Masing adopted the letter Õ, ending the confusion between several homographs and clearly showing how to pronounce a word.

In informal writing, e.g., emails, instant messaging and when using foreign keyboard layouts where the letter Õ is not available, some Estonians use the characters O or 6 to approximate this letter.

In most parts of the island Saaremaa, Õ is pronounced the same as Ö.

Hungarian 
In Hungarian, Õ only appears when a typeface (font set) does not contain a proper ő letter, which is an o with a double acute diacritic.
The letter Õ is not part of the Hungarian alphabet, it is an error  of improper computer font sets.

Samogitian
In Samogitian the letter Õ represents, as in Estonian, the unrounded back vowel  which is unique to Samogitian and is not found in Standard Lithuanian, this is a rather new innovation brought on by the ensuing efforts of standardising Samogitian, this letter alleviates the confusion between the two distinct pronunciations of the letter ė.

Portuguese
In the Portuguese language, the symbol Õ stands for a nasal close-mid back rounded vowel, also written  in IPA. It is not considered an independent letter of the alphabet: the tilde is the standard diacritic for nasalization.

Vietnamese
In the Vietnamese language, the symbol Õ stands for the sound  with creaky voice (rising tone with a glottal break followed by a continuation of the rising tone). Vietnamese also has derived letters Ỗ/ỗ and Ỡ/ỡ.

Võro
In the Võro language, this letter is the 25th letter of the alphabet, pronounced as in Estonian.

Skolt Sami
In the Skolt Sami language, this letter is the 25th letter of the alphabet, pronounced like in Estonian.

Voko
In the Voko language, the letter Õ represents 'ɔ̀ŋ'.

Mathematical use
The symbol, pronounced soft-O, is used as a variant of big O notation that ignores logarithmic factors.

Computer encoding
Due to character encoding confusion, the letters can be seen on many incorrectly coded Hungarian web pages, representing Ő/ő (letter O with double acute accent). This can happen due to said characters sharing a code point in the ISO 8859-1 and 8859-2 character sets, as well as the Windows-1252 and Windows-1250 character sets, and the web site designer forgetting to set the correct code page. Õ is not part of the Hungarian alphabet. The usage of Unicode avoids this type of problems. In Latex the option of using "\~o" and "\~O" exists.

See also
Ã
Tilde

References

 

Latin letters with diacritics
Vowel letters